IC 2220, also known as the Toby Jug Nebula, is a reflection nebula located 1200 light years away in the southern constellation of Carina.

References

External links
 

Reflection nebulae
Carina (constellation)
2220